The 1901 Oklahoma Sooners football team was an American football team that represented the University of Oklahoma as an independent during the 1901 college football season. In its first year under head coach Fred Roberts, the team compiled a 3–2 record and outscored their opponents by a combined total of 93 to 29.

The team played two games against the Texas Longhorns, the second and third meetings in the rivalry that later became known as the Red River Showdown.

Schedule

References

Oklahoma
Oklahoma Sooners football seasons
Oklahoma Sooners football